Swapna Khanna is an Indian actress who worked in Malayalam, Telugu, Tamil, Kannada and Hindi films from the 1980s and early 1990s. She was named Swapna, formerly Manjari Dhody, by Anil Sharma.

Swapna began her career with the P.G. Viswambharan directed Sangarsham (1981) and thereafter acted in several Tamil, Telugu and Malayalam language movies. She also appeared occasionally in Bollywood films like Teri Meherbaaniyan, Dak Bangla, Hukumat, Izzatdar, Janam Se Pehle and others. She guest starred in the Aditya Pancholi-starrer Qatil (1988). She quit the film industry after her marriage in 1993 and is now actively involved with her husband, Raman Khanna in an event management company called Sangini Entertainment that organises and manages Bollywood and Indian classical dance events abroad. Some of their shows include Shaam-E-Rangeen and DreamGirls Of Bollywood, which have been performed worldwide. Along with this she also runs a resort called "The Brook at Khanna's", which is located in Karjat, Mumbai.

Filmography

Kannada
 Bharjari Bete (1981)
Swapna (1981)
Karmika Kallanalla (1982)
Khadeema Kallaru

Tamil
Rusi (1984)
24 Mani Neram (1984) - Swapna
Puyalkadantha Boomi (1984)
Punitha Malar (1982) - Asha
Agni Sakshi (1982)
Tik Tik Tik (1981) - Swapna
Jadhikkoru Needi (1981)
Kadal Meengal (1981) - Nisha
Nenjile Thunivirunthal (1981)
Nellikkani (1980)

Telugu
Swapna (1981) as Swapna
 Priya (1981)
Parvati Parameshwarulu (1981)
Billa Ranga (1982)
Kokilamma (1983)
Kanchana Ganga (1984) as Ganga
Samsaram O Sangeetam (1984)
 Kathanayakudu (1984)
Pothe Ponni (2006)

Hindi

Guda (2003)Dhun (1996) Kis Kaam Ke Yeh Rishte  (1995)Janam Se Pehle (1994)Saboot Mangta Hain KanoonChingari Aur SholayZindagi Ek Juaa (1992) - Sapna BhatnagarUmar 55 Ki Dil Bachpan Ka (1992) - BhartiKisme Kitna Hai DumSwarg Jaisaa Ghar (1991)Kurbaan (1991)Farishtay (1991) -  Gayatri 
 GoriIzzatdaar (1990) - SonuAulad Ke Khatir (1990)
 Pyasi Meri Nigahen (1990)Ab Meri Baari (1989)Sachché Ká Bol-Bálá (1989) - ZarinaTujhe Nahin Chhodunga (1989)
 Indira (1989) - Geeta
 Sindoor Aur Bandook Paraya Ghar Lahu Ki Awaz Mera Muqaddar  (1988) - MaryAage Ki Soch (1988)Bandhan Baahon Ka Aai PahijeQatil (1988)  - KamlaDak Bangla (1987) - Sapna/Princess SapnaDacait (1987)Hukumat (1987) - SoniaKachchi Jawani  Patton Ki Baazi  (1986) - Mona 
 FitaratHaqeeqat (1985) - KusumTeri Meherbaniyan (1985) - Sharda Devi
 Lut Gayee Pyar Mein Sherdil Ladkiyan Ek Din Bahu Ka  (1983) - Indu

MalayalamKadathanadan Ambadi (1990) as Sreedevi ThampurattiNagapanchami (1989)Karate Girls (1988)Uyaran Orumikkan (1988)Unnikale Oru Katha Parayam (1987)Thidambu (1986)Premalekhanam (1985) as Saramma ThomasAngadikkappurathu (1985) as SherlyJeevante Jeevan (1985)Swanthamevide Bandhamevide (1984) as UshaUyarangalil (1984) as PadmaBullet (1984) as JulieMinimol Vathicanil (1984) as DaisyJeevitham (1984) as RenukaVikatakavi (1984) as SudhaAayiram Abhilashangal (1984)Bhookambam (1983) as NishaPrem Nazirine Kanmanilla (1983) as PappiGuru Dakshina (1983) as ReethaShesham Kazhchayil (1983) as ElizabethOnnu Chirikku (1983) as Rohini MenonMortuary (1983) as SindhuPaalam (1983) as AnithaYudham (1983)Asuran (1983)Varanmaare Aavashyamundu (1982) as PappiInnalenkil Nale (1982) as Vidhu Oru Thira Pinneyum Thira (1982) as RemaChambalkadu (1982) as SabithaPost Mortem (1982) as AliceAngachamayam (1982) as MallaVelicham Vitharunna Penkutti (1982) as AashaPanchajanyam (1982) as IndiraBheeman (1982)Dhrohi (1982)Garudan (1982)Ivan Oru Simham (1982) as SwapnaMarupacha (1982) as SwapnaJohn Jaffer Janardhanan (1982) as SophiyaChiriyo Chiri (1982) as Sethubhai ThampurattiSree Ayyappanum Vavarum (1982) as BhavaniAhimsa (1981) as RadhaThrishna (1981) as JayasreeSwarnapakshikal (1981) as DeviSangharsham'' (1981) as Sandhya

References

External links
 

Year of birth missing (living people)
Living people
Actresses in Kannada cinema
20th-century Indian actresses
Actresses in Tamil cinema
Actresses in Telugu cinema
Actresses in Malayalam cinema
Actresses in Hindi cinema
Indian film actresses